Tafsir or Tafseer (Arabic: تفسير translit. Tafsīr, lit. 'interpretation') is the Arabic word for exegesis, usually of the Qur'an.

Books
There are many exegesis works titled Tafsir or Tafsir al- (meaning Tafsir of) including:

Tafsir Ayyashi
Tafsir al-Baghawi
Tafsir al-Baydawi
Tafsir al-Durr al-Manthoor
Tafsir Furat Kufi
Tafseer Ghareeb al Quran or Al-Mufradat fi Gharib al-Quran
Tafsir Imam Ja'far al-Sadiq
Tafsir al-Jalalayn
Tafseer-e-Kabeer
Tafseer-e-Sagheer
Tafsir al-Kabir (al-Razi)
Tafsir ibn Kathir
Tafsir Maariful Quran
Tafsir al-Manar
Tafsir al-Mazhari
Tafsir Meshkat
Tafsir Al-Mishbah
Tafsir al-Mizan
Tafsir Nemooneh
Tafsir Noor
Tafsir Novin
Tafsir Qomi, or Tafsir Al-Qummi
Tafsir al-Qurtubi
Tafsir al-Tabari
Tafsir al-Tahrir wa'l-Tanwir
Tafsir al-Thalabi
Tafsir Zia ul Quran

Jewish works
Tafsir at-Tawriyya Bi-'l-'Arabiyya or Tafsir Rasag, a translation of the Torah into Judeo-Arabic by Saadia Gaon.

Persons
Tafsir Chérif (born 1996), Guinean footballer
Tafsir Malick Ndiaye (born 1953), Senegalese Judge of the International Tribunal for the Law of the Sea

See also
List of tafsir works
List of Shia books, the section Quranic Tafsirs
Tafsir al-Kabir (disambiguation), a number of works known by the name